Miguel Francis (born 28 March 1995) is a sprinter born in Montserrat, a British overseas territory, who as of 5 April 2017 represents Great Britain internationally. Francis, a resident of Antigua and Barbuda following his evacuation from Montserrat at just 6 months old, competed for that nation prior to April 2017. He competed for that country in the 200 metres at the 2015 World Championships in Beijing narrowly missing the final.

In 2016, it was reported that Francis had requested a transfer of allegiance to Great Britain; as a citizen of an overseas territory, Francis is entitled to compete for Great Britain under the same rules as Shara Proctor, Delano Williams and Zharnel Hughes. Unlike these athletes, however, Francis needed to serve a period out of competition, having represented another full national team, Antigua and Barbuda. On 5 April 2017 IAAF confirmed that Francis' transfer of allegiance was complete and that Francis was registered and eligible to compete for Great Britain 'with immediate effect'.

International competitions

1Disqualified in the final
2Did not start in the semifinals

Personal bests
Outdoor
100 metres – 10.23 (+0.9 m/s, Kingston 2019)
200 metres – 19.88 (+1.2 m/s, J.N. Racers, Jamaica, 2016) NR

References

External links

1995 births
Living people
Antigua and Barbuda male sprinters
Athletes (track and field) at the 2014 Commonwealth Games
Athletes (track and field) at the 2015 Pan American Games
Pan American Games competitors for Antigua and Barbuda
World Athletics Championships athletes for Antigua and Barbuda
Place of birth missing (living people)
Commonwealth Games competitors for Antigua and Barbuda